Sathuvachari is an area and Zone-II headquarters of Vellore Municipal Corporation. It is located in the east of Vellore city. It is situated in the bank of Palaar River.

Demographics

 India census, Sathuvachari had a population of above 1.5 lacs. Males constitute 50% of the population and females 50%. Sathuvachari has an average literacy rate of 79%, higher than the national average of 59.5%: male literacy is 84%, and female literacy is 75%. In Sathuvachari, 10% of the population is under 6 years of age. As per the religious census of 2011, Sathuvachari  had 85.01% Hindus, 7.9% Muslims, 6.5% Christians, 0.03% Sikhs, 0.04% Buddhists, 0.18% Jains, 0.32% following other religions and 0.01% following no religion or did not indicate any religious preference.

Historical Significance 
The Shiva Lingam of Jalakandeswarar temple was kept here , after the Muslim invaders , took over vellore fort.

References

External links
Sathuvachari
Sathuvacheri on wikimapia

Vellore
Neighbourhoods in Vellore